Bob Reynolds may refer to:

Bob Reynolds (American football, born 1914) (1914–1994), American football player, member of the College Football Hall of Fame
Bob Reynolds (American football, born 1939) (1939–1996), American football player
Bob Reynolds (baseball) (born 1947), Major League Baseball pitcher
Bob Reynolds (saxophonist) (born 1977), American jazz saxophonist
Bob Reynolds (superhero), Marvel Comics fictional character and superhero
Robert Rice Reynolds (1884-1963), U.S. Senator

See also
Bobby Reynolds (born 1982), American tennis player
Bobby Reynolds (ice hockey) (born 1967), ice hockey player
Robert Reynolds (disambiguation)